Dorothy Akpene Amenuke is a Ghanaian Sculptor/Fiber Artist and Lecturer. is currently a lecture at the Department of Painting and Sculpture at the Faculty of Fine Art, Kwame Nkrumah University of Science and Technology (KNUST).

Early life 
Amenuke was born in 1968 and comes from Adzokoe-Peki, in the Volta Region of Ghana. She studied sculpting at Ghana's Kwame Nkrumah University of Science and Technology (KNUST) as an undergraduate. She went on to KNUST for her MA in Art Education, MFA in Sculpture, and PhD in Sculpture.

Career 
She has worked professionally as an art teacher at the elementary and secondary school levelsfrom 1987 to 2004. Work by Amenuke is in the collection of the Stedelijk Museum Amsterdam.

References 

Ghanaian sculptors
1968 births
Living people
People from Volta Region
Kwame Nkrumah University of Science and Technology alumni
Academic staff of Kwame Nkrumah University of Science and Technology